Puma lacustris (also known as the lake cat) is an extinct species of Puma from the Blancan stage (from the Late Pliocene to Early Pleistocene). The type specimen is a partial fragment piece of the right side of the mandible retaining canine and cheek-teeth found in the Hagerman Fossil Beds National Monument from Idaho. The holotype was described in 1933 by Gazin who considered a smaller relative of the cougar. The taxonomic identity has been uncertain at times, as a relationship (and classification) to lynxes has been purposed. Additional specimens of this species of Puma have been found elsewhere in North America, such as Washington, California, Arizona, Texas, and Baja California.

References

Prehistoric felines
Puma (genus)
Prehistoric mammals of North America
Mammals described in 1933
Pliocene carnivorans